The Cape Cinema is a movie theatre located in Dennis, Massachusetts, United States, on Cape Cod. It specializes in independent American and international film, simulcasts of the Metropolitan Opera and National Theatre, and live music performances.

The Cape Cinema was founded in 1930 by Edna B. Tweedy and Raymond Moore, three years after Moore founded the Cape Playhouse. The building's exterior was designed by Alfred Easton Poor and modelled after the South Congregational Church in Centerville, Massachusetts. The auditorium is designed in the Art Deco style and includes 317 individual arm chairs of black lacquer and tangerine suede produced by the Frankl Galleries in New York. Moore and Tweedy commissioned American painter and illustrator Rockwell Kent to design a 6,400-square-foot mural for the auditorium's ceiling, featuring a representation of the heavens and constellations, and it was installed by set designer Jo Mielziner.
Since 1986, the Cape Cinema has operated as an independent art house, and in 2008 it launched a live music series which has spotlighted artists such as Bon Iver, Dirty Projectors, Glen Hansard, Saint Vincent, The Paper Kites, Tift Merritt, Martha Wainwright and Pat Fee.

In 1939, the Cape Cinema was the first theatre to preview The Wizard of Oz before its Hollywood premier. The Cape Cinema is owned by the Cape Cod Center for the Arts which includes the Cape Playhouse.

Interior Murals 
Raymond Moore contracted with Rockwell Kent for the design of the murals. Moore liked Kent's work and Kent had summered in the nearby town of Hyannis. The work of transferring and painting the designs on the 6,400-square-foot span was done by Kent's collaborator Jo Mielziner and a crew of stage set painters working in New York City. They worked in oil on strips of canvas that were then attached to the ceiling. Beginning from the lobby, the first of three sections depicts two constellations: a bull and a dog. The central and largest section depicts a dancing man and woman four times over as if dancing weightlessly across four frames of a film. Nearest the stage are two figures reaching toward a blazing disc, perhaps a comet or shooting star.

According to Kent, he did not paint and oversee the work himself because he refused to visit Massachusetts after the Sacco and Vanzetti execution of 1927. "Too many martinis" was the excuse he gave for having accepted the commission in the first place. He did go to Dennis in June 1930 and spend three days on the scaffolding, making suggestions and corrections. The signatures of both Kent and Mielziner appear on opposite walls of the cinema. The mural was described at the time as "what is said to be the world's largest mural".

Conservators from the Museum of Fine Arts, Boston restored the murals in 1981.

References

External links 
 
 A view of the ceiling, almost complete, black and white, American Art Deco: An Illustrated Survey, edited by R.L. Leonard and C.A. Glassgold (Courier Corporation, 2013)
 A less complete view, color, Getty Images, August 26, 2015
 A view of the ceiling: the dog constellation
 An image of Kent working on the murals, Popular Science Monthly, September 1930

Cinemas and movie theaters in Massachusetts
Music venues in Massachusetts
1930 establishments in Massachusetts
Event venues established in 1930
Dennis, Massachusetts